Paola Faccini Dori v Recreb Srl  (1994) C-91/92 is an EU law case, concerning the conflict of law between a national legal system and European Union law.

Facts
Interdiffusion Srl concluded a contract with Miss Faccini Dori at Milan Central Railway Station for an English language correspondence course. Miss Dori cancelled her order, but was then told Interdiffusion had assigned a claim against her to Recreb Srl. Miss Dori asserted she had a right of cancellation within 7 days under the Consumer Long Distance Contracts Directive 85/577/EEC. Italy had not taken steps to transpose the Directive into national law.

The Italian Court, the Giudice Conciliatore di Firenze, ordered Miss Dori to pay the money. She objected, and the court made a reference to the European Court of Justice.

Judgment

Advocate General Opinion
AG Lenz favoured horizontal direct effect.

Court of Justice
The Court of Justice held that Miss Dori had a right under the Directive, its provisions were unconditional and sufficiently precise, but without national implementing law she could not rely on the directive itself in an action against another private party: this followed TEEC article 189 (now TFEU article 288) saying that Directives are 'binding only in relation to "each Member State to which it is addressed".' However, the court would be under a duty to interpret national law, as far as possible in line with the Directive's purpose. Moreover, the state would have to 'make good the damage' caused for failure to implement the law.

See also

European Union law

Notes

References
G De Burca, 'Giving Effect to the European Community Directives' (1992) 55 MLR 215
Mead, 'The Obligation to Apply European Law: Is Duke Dead?’ (1991) 16 ELR 490
Greenwood, ‘Effect of EC Directives in National Law’ [1992] CLJ 3 
P Craig, 'Directives: Direct Effect, Indirect Effect and the Construction of National Legislation’ (1997) 22 ELR 519, 530–3

Court of Justice of the European Union case law